Buckner may refer to:

People 
 Buckner H. Payne (1799-1889), American clergyman, publisher, and racist pamphleteer
Buckner Thruston (1763–1845), U.S. Senator and judge from Kentucky
 Buckner (surname)

Music
 Buckner & Garcia was an American musical duo consisting of Jerry Buckner and Gary Garcia

Places  
Japan
 Buckner Bay, a former name for Nakagusuku Bay on Okinawa
 Fort Buckner, a U.S. Army base on Okinawa

United States
 Buckner, Arkansas
 Buckner, Kentucky
 Buckner, Illinois
 Buckner, Missouri
 Buckner, Texas
 Buckner Mountain in Washington

See also 
Bruckner (disambiguation)